Forrest Gene Taylor (born July 22, 1957) is an American university sports administrator, currently serving as the athletic director at Kansas State University, serving since May 2017. Prior to his current position, Taylor served as the deputy athletics director at the University of Iowa from 2014 to 2017, and was the athletics director at North Dakota State University from 2001 to 2014.

Career

Early career
Born in Safford, Arizona, Taylor graduated from Arizona State University in business in 1980 and completed his master's degree from St. Thomas University in 1985. After graduating from Arizona State, Taylor worked in restaurants while completing his master's degree. During the 1985–86 school year, Taylor served at Southern Methodist University working in the ticket office. For the next 15 years, Taylor would serve in various roles, including associate athletics director, at the United States Naval Academy from 1986 to 2001.

North Dakota State
In the summer of 2001, Taylor began his first full-time gig as an athletics director at North Dakota State. During his tenure at North Dakota State, Taylor more than tripled the department's budget, as well as helped the university transition from an NCAA Division II school to an NCAA Division I FCS school. Taylor also hired several successful coaches who have moved on to larger NCAA Division I schools: football coach Craig Bohl (2011–2013 FCS national champions) who is now at Wyoming, and basketball coaches Tim Miles (now at San Jose State) and Saul Phillips (now at Northern State). Taylor left for the University of Iowa to become the deputy athletic director in 2014.

In 2008 and 2012, Taylor was awarded the FCS Central Region Athletic Director of the Year.

Kansas State
In April 2017, Taylor was hired as the new athletics director at Kansas State University, replacing John Currie. During his first year-and-a-half at K-State, Taylor unveiled a new master plan for the athletics department, as well hired Pete Hughes as the head baseball coach, and Chris Klieman as head football coach, replacing Bill Snyder.  He currently serves on the College Football Playoff Selection committee.

Personal life
Taylor is married to his wife, Cathy, and has two children.

References

External links
 Kansas State profile

Living people
1957 births
Arizona State University alumni
Kansas State Wildcats athletic directors
North Dakota State Bison athletic directors
St. Thomas University (Florida) alumni
Sportspeople from Arizona